Miguel Eduardo Caneo (born August 17, 1983 in General Roca in Rio Negro Province) is a retired Argentine football midfielder.

Career
As a young boy he was part of the Boca Juniors youth system, to make his professional debut in the first team in 2003. He made a total of 33 appearances for the club in all competitions, scoring 2 goals. He was then transferred to Argentine club Quilmes in 2005 before joining Colo-Colo in 2006. In the January 2007 transfer window, Caneo returned to his native Argentina to play for Godoy Cruz de Mendoza.

Titles

External links
  Argentine Primera statistics at Futbol XXI
  Miguel Caneo at Soccerway

1983 births
Living people
Association football midfielders
Argentine footballers
Argentine expatriate footballers
Boca Juniors footballers
Quilmes Atlético Club footballers
Godoy Cruz Antonio Tomba footballers
People from General Roca
Boyacá Chicó F.C. footballers
Colo-Colo footballers
Arsenal de Sarandí footballers
Deportivo Cali footballers
Club Atlético Atlanta footballers
Boca Unidos footballers
Chilean Primera División players
Categoría Primera A players
Argentine Primera División players
Primera Nacional players
Primera B Metropolitana players
Torneo Federal A players
Expatriate footballers in Chile
Expatriate footballers in Colombia
Argentine expatriate sportspeople in Chile
Argentine expatriate sportspeople in Colombia